Taha Malik was born on 31 March 1987, in United States. He is a Pakistani-American record producer, musician, rapper, and Film score composer. On completing his formal education he begun his career as a record producer.

Early life 

During high school, Malik began exploring music-making on a desktop computer at home. In high school, he was DJing. He got a RadioShack MIDI keyboard and a Roland MC-909. This was the turning point to a career in music production. Still, Malik does not define his music as "electronic music." He says: "I like experimenting...I like to bend genres."

Career

Advertising 
Malik has worked with Ogilvy and Mather as music director, strategist and consultant, and with multinational brands. Malik has produced content television, radio, and digital campaigns. He has worked with longtime collaborator Adnan Malik, and filmmakers Ahsan Rahim, Kamal Khan, Asim Raza, and Sharmeen Obaid-Chinoy.

Cinema 
In 2019, Malik created songs in the films Laal Kabootar and Baaji. Malik's singing in Laal Kabootar was described by Something Haute as "power-packed vocals." According to the Express Tribune: "Laal Kabootar isn't only an impressive visual experience but its sound and production design further break new ground.

Laal Kabootar has been selected as Pakistan's official submission for the 92nd Academy Awards (Oscars), and is a candidate for nomination in the best International Feature Film category. Laal Kabootar (The Red Pigeon) was screened at the 2020 Palm Springs International Film Festival in California. It was also screened at the Singapore International Film Festival and won best feature at the Vancouver International South Asian Film Festival.

TV/DIgital 
In 2020, Malik wrote the original music score for YouTube's Season 1 of "Fundamental. Gender Justice. No Exceptions," which has been nominated for two DayTime Emmy Awards in 2021.

Installations 
In 2017, Malik contributed to HOME 1947, an exhibition in collaboration with the British Council, Citizen's Archive of Pakistan and Sharmeen Obaid. "Before arriving in Karachi, Home 1947 was showcased in Manchester in July, followed by Mumbai in August and Lahore in the month of October."

Credits

Filmography 

It's a Wonderful Afterlife (Remix)
Jalaibee
 Ho Mann Jahaan
 Janaan
 Laal Kabootar
 Baaji

Discography

Singles 

 Jaan Jaye ft. Lil Mike (2005)
Aajana ft. Najam Sheraz (Remix)
Nahi Hai Yeh Pyar ft. Haroon
 Holi Holi ft. Stereo Nation & Bohemia
Jalaibee ft. Umair Jaswal
Laal Kabootar ft. Zoe Viccaji
Jugart ft. Jabar Abbas
Raag Murli ft. Mai Dhai
 Sanwal ft. Sanam Marvi
Khilti Kali ft. Zeb Bangash
Gangster Guriya ft. Sunidhi Chauhan
Baby, Take It Easy ft. Sajjad Ali
Churails ft. Zoe Viccaji

Television

References

External links 

American record producers
1987 births
Living people